North Dakota Highway 3 (ND 3) is a  major north–south state highway in North Dakota, United States, that spans the entire state. It travels from South Dakota Highway 45 (SD 45) at the South Dakota state line, south of Ashley north to Manitoba Highway 10 (PTH 10) at the International Peace Garden on the Canada–United States border.

Route description

Major intersections

See also

 List of state highways in North Dakota
 List of highways numbered 3

References

External links

 

003
Transportation in McIntosh County, North Dakota
Transportation in Logan County, North Dakota
Transportation in Kidder County, North Dakota
Transportation in Wells County, North Dakota
Transportation in Pierce County, North Dakota
Transportation in Rolette County, North Dakota